Leslie Khoo Kwee Hock (born ) is a criminal from Singapore who was convicted for the murder of his Chinese girlfriend Cui Yajie, with whom he had a relationship despite the fact that he was already married with a son. Khoo, who had previous past convictions for cheating and forgery, was said to have argued with his girlfriend in a car on 12 July 2016, and the argument turned violent and Khoo strangled Cui in a moment of anger. Later, Khoo took Cui's corpse to a forest in Lim Chu Kang where he burnt the body for three days before he was arrested on 20 July 2016.

Khoo was found guilty of murder three years after his arrest and sentenced to life imprisonment. His case was the second murder conviction without a body after the high-profile Sunny Ang trial in 1965. The murder of Cui Yajie, which took place nearby Gardens by the Bay, became known as the Gardens by the Bay murder to the public.

Personal life
Leslie Khoo Kwee Hock was born in Singapore in 1968. After reaching his adult years and finishing his education, Khoo married twice, first in 1995 before he divorced and married another woman in 2001. He fathered a son in 2004 with his second wife. However, he was an unfaithful husband and committed adultery before. He had also smoked, drank and gambled. He used to be the owner of a successful business, and in 2001, due to a huge debt of S$300,000, he strangled his wife, leading to a personal protection order filed against him, before their relationship recovered. At another point, Khoo once again strangled his wife, as a result of her discovering his adultery, and she filed a personal protection order. Through counselling, their relationship were again repaired.

Khoo was first convicted in 2004 of criminal breach of trust and sentenced to six months in jail, and he had been caught for forgery. Seven years later, he was found guilty of a similar offence and served a longer 16-month jail term. He also twice committed offences related to misuse of computers in 2001 and 2016 respectively. In prison for his latest offence, Khoo turned to Christianity, and after his release, he became a volunteer of a welfare group which provide help to the former criminals and their families. He also found a job as a retail manager of a laundry business despite his criminal record, and had helped his former fellow prisoners and other convicts to find jobs in the same laundry business. Khoo's supervisor and colleagues noted him as a good employee who had a good work performance and believed him as a honest and reformed ex-convict.

Gardens by the Bay murder

Background

Despite having turned to religion, Leslie Khoo continued to have affairs with other women outside his marriage, and continued to cheat them of money. Of all the lovers, one of them was 31-year-old Chinese national Cui Yajie.

Cui Yajie, an only child in her family, was an engineer born in Tianjin, China. Cui, who graduated from University of Southampton, first came to work in Singapore since 2012, and had gained permanent residence status during her next three years in Singapore. When both Khoo and Cui first met in 2015 outside the home of her former boyfriend (with whom she just broke up with), Khoo comforted Cui and helped her out. Later, they began a relationship after he lied that he was single and was an owner of a laundry business when he himself was actually married with a son and was a retail manager of that same laundry business he claimed was his. Later, when Cui became suspicious, Khoo told her that he was divorced. Khoo's wife later got wind of her husband's relationship with Cui after Cui sent her a message on Facebook to demand that Khoo's wife leave Khoo alone.

The relationship would later on be riddled with quarrels over Khoo spending less time with Cui and a debt of $20,000 which he owed her for making investment with that same amount of money in gold. Half of that amount was eventually paid back by Khoo, who asked a former lover to, on his behalf, remit the money in Cui's father's bank account.

Murder
It was on that fateful day of 12 July 2016, in an unexpected turn of events, when Cui Yajie wanted to go to Khoo's workplace, supposedly to expose Khoo's lies, but Khoo intercepted her, and he offered to drive her to his workplace but he subsequently took her to a secluded place near Gardens by the Bay, where he intended to calm her down and dissuade her from meeting his supervisor. It was then during a heated quarrel, Khoo lost control of his temper and strangled 31-year-old Cui Yajie to death, and after he drove aimlessly around Singapore, he went back home at night with Cui's corpse, which was covered in laundry bags, still hidden in the car. The next day, Khoo took the body to a forest in Lim Chu Kang after buying some charcoal and kerosene, where he burnt it for three consecutive days.

On 17 July 2016, after the police investigated into the disappearance of Cui, Khoo, who was the last person to see her before her death, was arrested as a suspect. Khoo later confessed to the killing and he led the police to the place where he burned the body. By the time the police got there, there were only a few clumps of hair, a bra hook and partially burnt pieces of Cui's dress left at the site where Khoo burnt Cui's body. 48-year-old Leslie Khoo Kwee Hock was thus charged with murder and remanded in the case of Cui's death; he potentially faced the death penalty or life imprisonment if the courts found guilty of murder. This murder case became known as the "Gardens by the Bay murder" in media reports. Leslie Khoo also faced charges of cheating and embezzling a total of S$88,600 from his company and his four other lovers prior to his killing of Cui.

Trial and life imprisonment

Court hearing and conviction
When his trial started in the High Court of Singapore in March 2019, 50-year-old Leslie Khoo Kwee Hock, who denied having an affair with Cui or intended to kill Cui, tried to put up a defence of diminished responsibility against the murder charge by citing his intermittent explosive disorder (IED), which his lawyers argued that it made him suffering from an abnormality of mind, unable to take control of himself and thus impulsively strangled Cui to death. The defence also included both sudden and grave provocation and sudden fight, as Khoo pinpointed the blame on Cui for assaulting him and insulting him during the argument prior to her death. However, the prosecution did not accept the defences, and they called upon a psychiatrist who confirmed that Khoo was not suffering from diminished responsibility and still capable of self-control at the time of the strangulation, as well as citing the numerous lies and discrepancies in his account.

After an 11-day trial that lasted from March to July 2019, on 18 July 2019, Leslie Khoo was convicted of murder under Section 300(b) of the Penal Code. The trial judge Audrey Lim of the High Court did not accept that he was suffering from diminished responsibility, and also dismissed his other defences as well. The judge also stated that based on the claim of sudden fight and Cui's smaller body size, it is more likely that Khoo acted in a cruel and unusual manner and Cui never physically abuse Khoo at all; it would have been clear to Khoo that pressing Cui's neck with great force would likely lead to her death. Justice Lim additionally rejected Khoo's claim that he cremated Cui's body to allow her to rest in peace, and further affirmed that Khoo indeed had an affair with Cui despite his repeated denials. Due to the guilty verdict of murder, Khoo would either be sentenced to death, or to life imprisonment.

Submissions and verdict
The prosecutors, led by Hri Kumar Nair, sought a life sentence for Khoo in their final submissions on sentence while the defence asked for the sentence to be backdated to Khoo's date of remand. After adjourning sentencing for a month, on 19 August 2019, Justice Lim decided in her sentencing verdict that Khoo did not show any blatant disregard for human life or viciousness from the manner of killing, for which his case would not warrant the death penalty, in comparison to past cases of Chia Kee Chen and indirectly, Kho Jabing. She also accept that there is no premeditation of killing Cui Yajie on Khoo's part, as his intention all along was just to calm her down and dissuade her from confronting his supervisors, before the tragic incident.

Justice Lim also noted that while Khoo had gone to great lengths to dispose the body to cover up his crime and never called for help when Cui went motionless, it was not a relevant factor to be considered during sentencing. Besides, due to the cremation of the body, it was hard to ascertain the true extent of the injuries to observe the degree of viciousness exhibited in the manner of the killing. Hence, she decided to sentence 51-year-old Leslie Khoo Kwee Hock to life imprisonment and backdate Khoo's life term to the date of his remand, as what Khoo's lawyers requested for (and the prosecution did not object to it). Not only did he evade the death penalty, Khoo was also spared the cane as he was above 50 years old at the time of sentencing.

According to Mervyn Cheong Jun Ming, the defence lawyer who represented Khoo in his trial, he stated that Khoo has a right to appeal to the higher courts against his sentence, but despite having submitted it to the Court of Appeal, Khoo decided to give up and withdraw his appeal. Cheong also revealed that, from what he observed, Khoo gradually showed remorse for his actions, which was why he chose to not appeal his sentence. Cheong also revealed that at certain points when making his statements to the lawyer, Khoo would become emotional as he recounted his crime.

Leslie Khoo is currently serving his life sentence at Changi Prison. Although life imprisonment in Singapore meant the incarceration of a convict for the remainder of his lifespan, Khoo still faces the possibility of release on parole after the minimum of 20 years in prison, providing that he showed good behaviour while behind bars.

Aftermath
Leslie Khoo's case was the second case in Singapore's legal history where a person was convicted of murder in the absence of a body, after the case of Sunny Ang Soo Suan, a law student who was sentenced to death on 18 May 1965 for the 1963 murder of his barmaid girlfriend Jenny Cheok Cheng Kid during a scuba diving trip, solely based on circumstantial evidence and without the body. Ang was hanged on 6 February 1967 after he lost his appeals against the sentence. The case was also one of the iconic cases solved by the police using DNA and technology.

The case of Leslie Khoo was re-enacted in the year 2020's season of Crimewatch as its fifth episode on 20 September 2020. A few details of the case were altered in the re-enactment for dramatic purposes (e.g. the victim Cui Yajie's name was changed to Chen Peipei; while Khoo still keeps his name in the re-enactment).

Another crime show in 2022, titled Inside Crime Scene, also re-adapted the Gardens By the Bay murder case and aired the on-screen adaptation as its fourth and penultimate episode.

See also
 List of major crimes in Singapore (before 2000)
 List of major crimes in Singapore (2000–present)
 Capital punishment in Singapore
 Life imprisonment in Singapore
 List of murder convictions without a body
 List of cases affected by the Kho Jabing case

References

1968 births

Living people
Murder in Singapore
Prisoners sentenced to life imprisonment by Singapore
Prisoners and detainees of Singapore
Murder convictions without a body
Singaporean prisoners sentenced to life imprisonment
Life imprisonment in Singapore
Violence against women in Singapore